Glenn Gould performed with orchestra on several recordings.

Conductors and orchestras

Leonard Bernstein
Leonard Bernstein described his working together as a conductor with Gould as a pianist as "submit[ting] to a soloist's wholly new and incompatible concept".

Studio albums

{{ external media|align=center|width=270px|audio1=You may hear Glenn Gould performing with Leonard Bernstein and the Columbia Symphony Orchestra in:  Ludwig van Beethoven's Piano Concerto No.2 in B Flat Major, Op. 19  Johann Sebastian Bach's Keyboard Concerto No. 1 in D Minor, BWV 1052  in 1957 [https://archive.org/details/beethoven-concerto-no.-2-in-b-flat-major-for-piano-and-orchestra-op-19-bach-conc 'Here on archive.org] }}
Beethoven: Concerto No. 2 in B flat Major for Piano and Orchestra, Op. 19 - Bach: Concerto No. 1 in D Minor for Piano and Orchestra is the third album of the Canadian classical pianist Glenn Gould. It contained a 1957 recording of Ludwig van Beethoven's second Piano Concerto and Johann Sebastian Bach's Keyboard Concerto BWV 1052, with Leonard Bernstein conducting the Columbia Symphony Orchestra.

The recordings were made in 1957 at Columbia Records 30th Street studio in Manhattan over four days between April 9 and April 11 and April 30. Columbia Masterworks Records, the company's classical music division, released the album in October 1957. The album was produced by Howard H. Scott.  This record is now in the catalog of Sony Classical Records.

The next studio album where Gould, Bernstein and the Columbia Symphony orchestra worked together was the 1960 recording of Beethoven's third piano concerto.

In 1961 Gould and Bernstein recorded Beethoven's fourth piano concerto with the New York Philharmonic Orchestra.

1962 concert

Vladimir Golschmann

In the late 1950's Columbia Masterworks invited a young Glen Gould to collaborate with the French conductor Vladimir Golschmann and the Columbia Symphony Orchestra in a recording of works by Ludwig van Beethoven and Johann Sebastian Bach which included Beethoven's Piano Concerto No. 1 in C major, Op. 15 and Bach's Keyboard Concerto No. 5 in F minor, BWVV 1056 (ML 5298, 1958).

In the 1960's Gould collaborated once again with Golschmann and the Columbia Symphony Orchestra in a series of recordings of several of Johann Sebastian Bach's Concertos for Keyboard and Orchestra Audio recording: Glann Gould, Vladimir Golschmann and the Columbia Symphony Orchestra performing Bach's Keyboard Concerto No. 3, No. 5, No. 7 on Archive.org  
Studio albums   
Bach: Keyboard Concerto No. 2 in E major BWV 1053 (MS 7294, 1969)Bach: Keyboard Concerto No. 3 in D major BWV 1054 (ML, 6401, 1967)Bach: Keyboard Concerto No. 4 in A major BWV 1055 (MS 7294, 1969)Bach: Keyboard Concerto No. 5 in F minor, BWV 1056 (ML 5298, 1958) Bach: Keyboard Concerto No. 5 in F minor BWV 1056 (ML 6401, 1967)Bach: Keyboard Concerto No. 7 in G minor, BWV 1058 (ML 6401, 1967) Beethoven: Piano Concerto No. 1 in C major, Op. 15 (ML 5298, 1958)

 Walter Susskind

In the 1960's Gould also joined forces with his fellow musicians from Canada in the CBC Symphony Orchestra under the direction of the British conductor Walter Susskind and the American conductor Robert Craft to release a recording of works by Wolfgang Amadeus Mozart and Arnold Shoenberg for Columbia Masterworks which included:
Studio Albums   
Mozart:  Piano Concerto No. 24 in C minor, K. 491 (MS 6339, 1962) 
Shoenberg: Concerto for Piano and Orchestra, Op. 42 (MS 6339, 1962)

Glenn Gould conducting

In the early 1960's, Gould was already conducting orchestral ensembles from the piano in several hour-long educational lectures which were broadcast on CBC public television. These included the program Glenn Gould on Bach which featured a performance of Bach's Brandenburg Concerto No. 5 in D major in which Gould collaborated with Julius Baker and Oscar Shumsky.
 
On September 8, 1982, a few weeks before his death, Gould conducted a chamber orchestra in Wagner's Siegfried Idyll. Sony later released the recording together with three piano transcriptions of Wagner music by Gould, played by himself, from a 1973 album. Gould's performances of the Siegfried Idyll'', both the piano and orchestral version, have an extremely slow tempo.

See also

Glenn Gould discography

References

Glenn Gould albums